Guilvinec or Le Guilvinec is a commune in the Finistère department of Brittany in north-western France. The commune was created in 1880 from part of the commune Plomeur.

Population
Inhabitants of Guilvinec are called in French Guilvinistes.

Economy
Guilvinec is an important fishing port.

Breton language
The municipality launched a linguistic plan through Ya d'ar brezhoneg on 4 February 2006.

See also
Communes of the Finistère department

References

External links

Official website 

Mayors of Finistère Association 

Communes of Finistère
Port cities and towns on the French Atlantic coast